"The Vision of Love" is Kris Allen's first single from his second studio album Thank You Camellia. It was released as a CD single, digital download, and to Hot AC radio on March 26, 2012.

Background
On March 2, 2012, Allen announced he was to release an unnamed single. He later revealed the title and the release date. The song was written by Allen, Adam Messinger and Nasri Atweh.

Track listing

Music video
The music video was directed by Lenny Bass and shot in downtown Los Angeles, CA on March 13, 2012. The video premiered on April 4, 2012 on Allen's official Vevo page.

The video for "The Vision of Love" presents the storyline of two teens, one insecure and lonely, the other tormented by bullying, and ultimately shows how acts of kindness helps those suffering find inner strength and confidence. The scenes of the teens are interwoven with Kris performing the song in an empty loft.

Promotion
Allen performed "The Vision of Love" live for the first time at The Mint in Los Angeles February 9, 2012. On April 4, 2012 he performed "The Vision Of Love" on the Billboard.com's The Music Insider.

Allen performed "The Vision of Love" and other new material from his forthcoming album at the “Live in the Vineyard” festival on April 13, 2012 at the Uptown Theater, in Napa, CA, alongside Jason Mraz, Mat Kearney, Jon McLaughlin and others.

Allen appeared on the American Idol television show on April 19, 2012 performing the single as a part of the Top 7 results show.

Credits and personnel
Credits are adapted from the liner notes of "The Vision of Love".

Recording
Recorded at The Ox, North Hollywood, California

Personnel
 Kris Allen – Vocals & acoustic guitars
 Adam Messinger - All other instrumentation
 The Messengers – Production
 Phil Tan – Mixing
 Daniela Rivera – Additional/assistant engineering

Maison & Dragen Radio Remix
Remix & Additional Production by Maison & Dragen

A&R
Keith Naftaly & Rob Inadomi
Management
19 Entertainment

Commercial performance
As of April 21, 2012, 21,000 copies of the single have been downloaded in the US.

Charts
The Vision of Love charted at number three on Billboard's Hot Single Sales dated April 14, 2012.

Weekly charts

Release history

References

2012 songs
Kris Allen songs
Rock ballads
Songs written by Adam Messinger
Songs written by Nasri (musician)
2012 singles
19 Recordings singles
RCA Records singles